William Frazer Browne was an Irish Fianna Fáil politician. He was first elected to Dáil Éireann as a Fianna Fáil Teachta Dála (TD) for the Leitrim–Sligo constituency at the 1932 general election. He was re-elected at the 1933 general election but lost his seat at the 1937 general election.

References

Year of birth missing
Year of death missing
Fianna Fáil TDs
Members of the 7th Dáil
Members of the 8th Dáil
Politicians from County Sligo